Jose Molina, born in 1971 in San Juan, Puerto Rico, is a screenwriter. He wrote the episodes "Trash" and "Ariel" for the American cult TV show Firefly, and multiple episodes for Dark Angel. Molina attended Yale University (Pierson College, class of 1993), where he successfully applied for a student internship with the Academy of Television Arts and Sciences by submitting a spec script for Star Trek: The Next Generation.  Molina has also worked on Law & Order: Special Victims Unit, earning the 2006 American Latino Media Arts Award for "Outstanding Script for a Television Drama or Comedy" for the episode "Alien".  More recently, he has written the episodes "Famous Last Words" and "Suicide Squeeze" for the television series Castle, on which he served as Co-Executive Producer, a title Molina carried into the first season of the Syfy original series Haven.

Molina followed his stint in genre cable with a return to in-network genre, becoming one of the head writers on the Steven Spielberg-produced series Terra Nova, which aired for 13 episodes in the fall at Fox. After the cancellation of Terra Nova, Molina moved briefly to NBC's rookie fairy-tale drama Grimm before landing on his current series, the flagship of The CW Network, The Vampire Diaries.

The Official Firefly Visual Companion #3, "Still Flying," released in May 2010, features a short story written by Molina.

Filmography

References

External links
 
 
 

1971 births
Living people
American television producers
American television writers
American male television writers
People from San Juan, Puerto Rico